Thorium-232 is the main naturally occurring isotope of thorium, with a relative abundance of 99.98%. It has a half life of 14 billion years, which makes it the longest-lived isotope of thorium. It decays by alpha decay to radium-228; its decay chain terminates at stable lead-208.

Thorium-232 is a fertile material; it can capture a neutron to form thorium-233, which subsequently undergoes two successive beta decays to uranium-233, which is fissile. As such, it has been used in the thorium fuel cycle in nuclear reactors; various prototype thorium-fueled reactors have been designed; however, as of 2022, thorium has not been used for large-scale commercial nuclear power.

Natural occurrence
The half-life of thorium-232 (14 billion years) is more than three times the age of the Earth; thorium-232 therefore occurs in nature as a primordial nuclide. Other thorium isotopes occur in nature in much smaller quantities as intermediate decay products of uranium-238, uranium-235, and thorium-232.

Some minerals that contain thorium include apatite, sphene, zircon, allanite, monazite, pyrochlore, thorite, and xenotime.

Decay

Thorium-232 has a half-life of 14 billion years and mainly decays by alpha decay to radium-228 with a  decay energy of 4.0816 MeV. The decay chain follows the thorium series, which terminates at stable lead-208. The intermediates in the thorium-232 decay chain are all relatively short-lived; the longest-lived intermediate decay products are radium-228 and thorium-228, with half lives of 5.75 years and 1.91 years, respectively. All other intermediate decay products have half lives of less than four days.

The following table lists the intermediate decay products in the thorium-232 decay chain:

Rare decay modes
Although thorium-232 mainly decays by alpha decay, it also undergoes spontaneous fission 1.1% of the time. In addition, it is capable of 
cluster decay, splitting into ytterbium-182, neon-24, and neon-26; the upper limit for the branching ratio of this decay mode is 2.78%. Double beta decay to uranium-232 is also theoretically possible, but has not been observed.

Use in nuclear power

Thorium-232 is not fissile; it therefore cannot be used directly as fuel in nuclear reactors.

One potential advantage of a thorium-based nuclear fuel cycle is that thorium is more abundant in nature than uranium, the current fuel for commercial nuclear reactors. It is also more difficult to produce material suitable for nuclear weapons from the thorium fuel cycle compared to the uranium fuel cycle. Some proposed designs for thorium-fueled nuclear reactors include the molten salt reactor and a fast neutron reactor, among others. Although thorium-based nuclear reactors have been proposed since the 1960s and several prototype reactors have been built, there has been relatively little research on the thorium fuel cycle compared to the more established uranium fuel cycle; thorium-based nuclear power has not seen large-scale commercial use as of 2022. Nevertheless, some countries such as India have actively pursued thorium-based nuclear power.

References

Actinides
Isotopes of thorium
Fertile materials
IARC Group 1 carcinogens
Radionuclides used in radiometric dating